Émile Lejeune is the name of:

Emile Lejeune (1885–?), US sailor, recipient of the Medal of Honor
Emile Lejeune (cyclist) (1895-1973), French cyclist
Émile Lejeune (painter) (1885–1964), Swiss painter born in Geneva, see Les Six
Émile Lejeune (footballer) (born 1939), Belgian footballer, see 1962 FIFA World Cup qualification (UEFA – Group 1)
 Emile Lejeune, doctor who authored a report in 1923 describing conditions of forced labor in the Belgian Congo

For other people with the surname Lejeune, LeJeune or Le Jeune, see Lejeune

References